Jonathan Stark (born April 3, 1971) is a former professional tennis player from the United States. During his career he won two Grand Slam doubles titles (the 1994 French Open Men's Doubles and the 1995 Wimbledon Championships Mixed Doubles). Stark reached the world No. 1 doubles ranking in 1994.

Early life
Stark was born in Southern Oregon in the city of Medford on April 3, 1971. In college he played tennis for Stanford University, where he was a singles and doubles All-American in 1990 and 1991. He reached the NCAA doubles final in 1991, partnering Jared Palmer. On July 17, 1997, he married Dana, and they have two sons and a daughter. He was coached by Donald Bozarth and became one of the top juniors.

Professional tennis
Stark turned professional in 1991 and joined the ATP Tour. In 1992, he won his first tour doubles title at Wellington. His first top-level singles title came in 1993 at Bolzano (beating Cédric Pioline in the final).

In 1994, Stark captured the men's doubles title at the French Open, partnering Byron Black (the pair were also runners-up at the Australian Open that year).  He reached his career-high singles ranking of World No. 36 in February.  The following year, Stark won the Wimbledon mixed doubles title, partnering Martina Navratilova.

Stark won his second top-level singles title in 1996 at Singapore (beating Michael Chang in the final). He was a member of the 1997 U.S. Davis Cup team. In 1997, Stark won the doubles title at the ATP Tour World Championships, partnering Rick Leach. The final doubles title of Stark's career came in 2001 at Long Island.

Over the course of his career, Stark won two top-level singles titles and 19 tour doubles titles. His career prize-money totaled US$3,220,867. Stark retired from the professional tour in 2001, lives in Portland, Oregon, and coaches with Portland-based Oregon Elite Tennis. He was inducted into the Oregon Sports Hall of Fame in 2009.

Junior Grand Slam finals

Singles: 1 (1 title)

Doubles: 3 (3 titles)

ATP career finals

Singles: 3 (2 titles, 1 runner-up)

Doubles: 40 (19 titles – 21 runners-up)

Runners-up (21)

Mixed doubles: 1 (1-0)

ATP Challenger and ITF Futures Finals

Singles: 2 (2–0)

Doubles: 3 (2–1)

Performance timelines

Singles

Doubles

Mixed doubles

References

External links 
 
 
 

1971 births
American male tennis players
French Open champions
French Open junior champions
Hopman Cup competitors
Living people
Sportspeople from Medford, Oregon
Stanford Cardinal men's tennis players
Tennis people from Oregon
US Open (tennis) champions
US Open (tennis) junior champions
Wimbledon champions
Wimbledon junior champions
Grand Slam (tennis) champions in mixed doubles
Grand Slam (tennis) champions in men's doubles
Grand Slam (tennis) champions in boys' singles
Grand Slam (tennis) champions in boys' doubles
ATP number 1 ranked doubles tennis players